Nightingale's Boys is a drama series of seven plays about the reunion of a group of friends from school, brought together after twenty-five years by their form teacher,  Mr. Nightingale.

Cast
 Derek Farr - Mr Nightingale
 Pauline Yates -  Margaret
 Terry Gilligan -  Nick Selby 
 Michael Hawkins - Hal Crowther

Plot
A group of middle-aged men from Northern England who were each in the same class in 1949 are brought back together by their form teacher, Bill Nightingale, and find that each of them is at a turning points in his life.

Episodes

Tweety (by Arthur Hopcraft)

Izzy (by C P Taylor)

Big Sid (by Jack Rosenthal)

Flossie (by Colin Spencer)

Spivvy (by John Finch)

"A. J." (by Alexander Baron)

Decision (by Arthur Hopcraft)

DVD release

Network DVD released the complete series on DVD in 2012.

References

External links

1970s British drama television series
ITV television dramas
Television shows produced by Granada Television
English-language television shows